The 1541 Algiers expedition occurred when Charles V of the Holy Roman Empire and king of Spain attempted to lead an amphibious attack against regency of Algiers, in modern Algeria. Inadequate planning, particularly against unfavourable weather, led to the failure of the expedition.

Background
Algiers had been under the control of the Ottoman Emperor Suleiman the Magnificent since its capture in 1529 by Hayreddin Barbarossa. Barbarossa had left Algiers in 1535 to be named High Admiral of the Ottoman Empire in Constantinople, and was replaced as governor by Hassan Agha, a eunuch and Sardinian renegade. Hassan had in his service the well-known Ottoman naval commanders Dragut, Sālih Reïs, and Sinān Pasha.

Charles V made considerable preparations for the expedition, wishing to obtain revenge for the recent siege of Buda, However the Spanish and Genoese fleets were severely damaged by a storm, forcing him to abandon the venture.

Expedition
Charles V embarked very late in the season, on 28 September 1541, delayed by troubles in Germany and Flanders. The fleet was assembled in the Bay of Palma, at Majorca. It had more than 500 sails and 24,000 soldiers.

After enduring difficult weather, the fleet only arrived in front of Algiers on 19 October. The most distinguished Spanish commanders accompanied Charles V on this expedition, including Hernán Cortés, the conqueror of Mexico, though he was never invited to the War Council.

Troops were disembarked on 23 October, and Charles established his headquarters on a land promontory surrounded by German troops. German, Spanish, and Italian troops, accompanied by 150 Knights of Malta, began to land while repelling Algerine opposition, soon surrounding the city, except for the northern part.

The fate of the city seemed to be sealed, however the following day the weather became severe, with heavy rain. Many galleys lost their anchors, and 15 were wrecked onshore. Another 33 carracks sank, while many more were dispersed. As more troops were attempting to land, the Algerines started to make sorties, slaughtering the newly arrived. Charles V was surrounded, and was only saved by the resistance of the Knights of Malta.

Andrea Doria managed to find a safer harbour for the remainder of the fleet at Cape Matifu, five miles east of Algiers. He enjoined Charles V to abandon his position and join him in Matifu, which Charles V did with great difficulty. From there, still oppressed by the weather, the remaining troops sailed to Bougie, still a Spanish harbour at that time. Charles could only depart for the open sea on 23 November. Throwing his horses and crown overboard, Charles abandoned his army and sailed home. He finally reached Cartagena, in southeast Spain, on 3 December.

Losses amongst the invading force were heavy with 150 ships lost, plus large numbers of sailors and soldiers. A Turkish chronicler confirming that the Berber tribes massacred 12,000 invaders. So many of Charles' troops were taken captive that there was a glut of slaves on the market in Algiers, so that 1541 was said to be the year when Christians were sold for the price of an onion per head.

Aftermath
The disaster considerably weakened the Spanish, and Hassan Agha took the opportunity to attack Mers-el-Kebir, the harbour of the Spanish base of Oran, in July 1542.

See also
Algiers Expedition (1516)
Algiers Expedition (1519)

Notes

References
 Garnier, Edith L'Alliance Impie Editions du Felin, 2008, Paris  Interview

Battles involving the Holy Roman Empire
Battles involving Spain
Naval battles involving the Knights Hospitaller
Battles involving the Ottoman Empire
Conflicts in 1541
Ottoman–Spanish conflicts
Spanish Africa
History of Algiers
Charles V, Holy Roman Emperor
Suleiman the Magnificent
16th century in Algeria
1541 in the Holy Roman Empire
1541 in the Ottoman Empire
1541 in Europe
1541 in Africa
Amphibious operations involving Spain
16th century in Algiers